Kenneth Golden may refer to:
 Kenneth M. Golden, American applied mathematician
 Kenneth Ivan Golden, American physicist